Phegopteris connectilis, commonly known as long beech fern, northern beech fern, and narrow beech fern, is a species of clonal fern native to forests of the Northern Hemisphere. It grows to heights of 10-50 cm.

Unlike its close relative, Phegopteris hexagonoptera, which is terrestrial, this species is often epipetric as well as terrestrial.

This species is normally apogamous, with a chromosome count of n=90 (triploid; "3n"=90).

Chemistry 
The phenolic compounds 2,4,6-trihydroxybenzoic acid-4-O-2′,3′,4′,6′-tetraacetylglucoside; 2,4,6-trihydroxybenzoic acid-4-O-2′,3′,6′-triacetylglucoside; 2,4,6-trihydroxybenzoic acid-4-O-3′,4′,6′-triacetylglucoside; 3-O-p-coumaroylshikimic acid; 2-(trans-1,4-dihydroxy-2-cyclohexenyl)-5-hydroxy-7-methoxychromone; kaempferol; and kaempferol-3-O-β-d-glucoside can be isolated from the methanolic extract of fronds of Phegopteris connectilis.

References

External links 
USDA PLANTS Profile

Flora of Korea
Flora of North America
Ferns of Europe
Thelypteridaceae